Kim Naidzinavicius (born 6 April 1991) is a German handball player for SG BBM Bietigheim and the German national team.

Achievements
EHF European League:
Winner: 2022
Bundesliga:
Winner: 2017, 2019, 2022

References

External links

1991 births
Living people
German female handball players
German people of Lithuanian descent
People from Gelnhausen
Sportspeople from Darmstadt (region)